Pullampet is a village in Annamayya district of the Indian state of Andhra Pradesh. It is located in Pullampeta mandal of Rajampeta revenue division.

Geography
It has an average elevation of 161 meters (531 feet).

References 

Villages in Kadapa district